is a train station on the Minobu Line of Central Japan Railway Company (JR Central) located in the town of Ichikawamisato, Nishiyatsushiro District, Yamanashi Prefecture, Japan.

Lines
Ochii Station is served by the Minobu Line and is located 61.8 kilometers from the southern terminus of the line at Fuji Station.

Layout
Ochii Station has one side platform serving a single bi-directional track. There is no station building, but there is a wooden shelter on the platform. The station is unattended.

Platforms

Adjacent stations

History
Ochii Station was opened on June 1, 1930 as a passenger stop on the Fuji-Minobu Line. It was upgraded to a full station on October 1, 1938. The line came under control of the Japanese Government Railways on May 1, 1941. The JGR became the JNR (Japan National Railway) after World War II. Along with the division and privatization of JNR on April 1, 1987, the station came under the control and operation of the Central Japan Railway Company.

Surrounding area
 The station is located in a residential district approximately 300 meters from Kai-Iwama Station

See also
 List of railway stations in Japan

External links

  Minobu Line station information 

Railway stations in Japan opened in 1930
Railway stations in Yamanashi Prefecture
Minobu Line
Ichikawamisato, Yamanashi